Chad Ashton (born October 26, 1967 in Denver, Colorado) is an American former soccer midfielder who spent one season in Major League Soccer, four in the American Professional Soccer League, six in the National Professional Soccer League and one in the Major Indoor Soccer League. He coached for ten years at the collegiate level and as assistant coach of D.C. United.

Youth
Ashton grew up in Colorado, earning 1986 Colorado high school player of the year recognition (Iver C. Ranum High School).  He then attended the University of North Carolina at Chapel Hill where he played on the men's soccer team from 1986 to 1989.  Over his four-year career, he scored 20 goals and added 43 assists in 89 games.  He was 1987, 1988 and 1989 second team All Atlantic Coast Conference.  He is the team's all-time career assists leader.

Professional
In 1990, Ashton signed with the Colorado Foxes of the American Professional Soccer League.  The Foxes won the 1992 and 1993 APSL championship. He was the MVP of the 1993 APSL title game.  In October 1990, the Milwaukee Wave selected Ashton in the third round of the National Professional Soccer League draft.  However, the Kansas City Comets selected Ashton in the first round of the Major Indoor Soccer League draft and he signed with them.  Ashton signed with the Denver Thunder in the National Professional Soccer League.  The team folded following the season.  At some point, he played for the Colorado Comets in the USISL.  In the fall of 1993, he signed with the Milwaukee Wave in the NPSL  The next season, he moved to the Wichita Wings.  He saw time in only one game, but rebounded with twenty games during the 1995–1996 season.  He continued to play the winter indoor season with the Wings through the 1997–1998 season.  In February 1996, the Dallas Burn selected Ashton in the 2nd round (18th overall) of the 1996 MLS Supplemental Draft.  He played twenty-three games, scoring one goal.  In the spring of 1997, he returned to the Colorado Foxes for one more season.

Coach
In 1995, the University of Denver hired Ashton as head coach of its men's soccer team.  He took the team to a 9–8–2 season, but left the school to pursue his MLS career.  In 1998, he returned to the University of Denver.
During his ten seasons as head coach of the University of Denver, he compiled a record of 85–85–14. He was the 2004 and 2006 Mountain Pacific Sports Federation Coach of the Year.  

On January 17, 2007, D.C. United hired Ashton as an assistant coach.  In addition to his first team duties, he coached the United reserve team. For 13 years, Ashton served as an assistant coach under three different coaches for United: Tom Soehn, Curt Onalfo, and Ben Olsen. On October 8, 2020, Ashton became D.C. United's interim head coach after the departure of Olsen. On April 20, 2022, Ashton once again became D.C. United's interim head coach following the departure of Hernán Losada.

References

External links
 D.C. United coaching profile
 MISL stats

1967 births
Living people
American soccer coaches
American soccer players
American Professional Soccer League players
Colorado Comets players
Colorado Foxes players
FC Dallas players
Denver Thunder players
Kansas City Comets (original MISL) players
Major Indoor Soccer League (1978–1992) players
Major League Soccer players
Milwaukee Wave players
National Professional Soccer League (1984–2001) players
Denver Pioneers men's soccer coaches
North Carolina Tar Heels men's soccer players
A-League (1995–2004) players
Wichita Wings (NPSL) players
FC Dallas draft picks
D.C. United non-playing staff
Association football midfielders
Soccer players from Colorado
Sportspeople from the Denver metropolitan area
People from Westminster, Colorado